Teresa Heinz (born Maria Teresa Thierstein Simões-Ferreira; October 5, 1938), also known as Teresa Heinz Kerry, is a Portuguese-American businesswoman and philanthropist. Heinz is the widow of former U.S. Senator John Heinz and the wife of former U.S. Secretary of State, longtime U.S. Senator, and 2004 Democratic presidential nominee John Kerry. Heinz is Chair of the Heinz Endowments and the Heinz Family Philanthropies.

Early life
Maria Teresa Thierstein Simões-Ferreira was born in the city of Lourenço Marques (later renamed Maputo) in the east African colony of Portuguese Mozambique, which later became the nation of Mozambique. Her parents were José Simões-Ferreira, Jr., a Portuguese-born oncologist and tropical disease specialist, and Irene Thierstein, a Portuguese and British national. Irene Thierstein's father was the scion of a Swiss-German family living in Malta, and her mother was the half-French, half-Italian daughter of an Alexandrian shipowner who traded with Russia during the Crimean War; both emigrated to Portuguese East Africa.

In 1960, Simões-Ferreira earned a Bachelor of Arts in Romance Languages and Literature from the University of the Witwatersrand, Johannesburg, South Africa. In 1963, she graduated from the School of Translation and Interpretation at the University of Geneva and moved to the United States to be an interpreter at the United Nations.

Marriages, children, and personal life
On February 5, 1966, at Pittsburgh, Pennsylvania's gothic Heinz Chapel on the campus of the University of Pittsburgh, Simões-Ferreira married future U.S. Senator John Heinz, an heir to the H. J. Heinz Company. In 1971, Teresa Heinz became a naturalized United States citizen. The couple had three sons:
Henry John Heinz IV (born November 4, 1966)
André Thierstein Heinz (born December 9, 1969)
Christopher Drake Heinz (born March 20, 1973)

In 1990, Teresa Heinz met Senator Kerry at an Earth Day rally. This was the only reported time the two met before Senator Heinz died in a plane crash on April 4, 1991. In 1992, Teresa Heinz met Kerry again, this time at the Earth Summit in Rio de Janeiro, Brazil. Heinz was a member of a State Department delegation appointed by then-President George H. W. Bush. The two began courting in 1993 and were married May 26, 1995, in Nantucket, Massachusetts. Choosing to remain registered as a Republican until John Kerry's presidential bid in 2004, Heinz retained the name Teresa Heinz. In May 2004, she said: My legal name is still Teresa Heinz. Teresa Heinz Kerry is my name... for politics. Just so people don't ask me questions about so and so is so and so's wife or this and that. Teresa Heinz is what I've been all my growing-up life, adult life, more than any other name. And it's the name of my boys, you know ?... So, that's my legal name and that's my office name, my Pittsburgh name.
In addition to Portuguese (her native language), Heinz speaks English, Spanish, French, and Italian. She is Roman Catholic.

Health
In December 2009, Heinz revealed that she was being treated for breast cancer. Heinz indicated that she had undergone several lumpectomies and would be following up with a targeted type of radiation therapy treatment called accelerated partial breast irradiation (APBI).

On July 7, 2013, Heinz was taken by ambulance to Nantucket Cottage Hospital after showing symptoms consistent with a seizure. She was described as being in "critical but stable" condition. Heinz was then flown to Massachusetts General Hospital for further medical treatment and tests. Her condition was upgraded to fair the next day, and doctors were able to rule out a heart attack, brain tumor, stroke, and other triggers. On July 11, she was transferred to Spaulding Rehabilitation Hospital to continue her recovery. Heinz was released on July 17, 2013, from Spaulding Rehabilitation Hospital in Boston. She recovered at home after some limited out-patient treatment.

Philanthropy
Teresa Heinz is the chair of the Heinz Endowments and the Heinz Family Philanthropies, disbursing money to various social and environmental causes. She assists the City of Pittsburgh, where the Heinz family has many financial and family connections. In recognition of her philanthropy and activism, Heinz has received honorary doctoral degrees from the following 12 institutions:
 Bank Street College of Education
 Beloit College
 Carlow University
 Carnegie Mellon University
 Clark University
 Drexel University
 Kenyon College
 Medical College of Pennsylvania
 Pine Manor College
 University of Massachusetts Boston
 University of Massachusetts Dartmouth
 Washington & Jefferson College
 University of the Witwatersrand, Johannesburg

In 2003, Heinz was awarded the Albert Schweitzer Gold Medal for Humanitarianism. She has been elected a Fellow of the American Academy of Arts and Sciences. She has been a Trustee of the St. Paul's School (Concord, New Hampshire), which Kerry attended.

Heinz is on the Board of Selectors of Jefferson Awards for Public Service.

Environmental programs and advocacy
Heinz has contributed to the environmental movement through many programs and outreach efforts. In 1990, she co-founded the Alliance to End Childhood Lead Poisoning (later known as the Alliance for Healthy Homes, it has since merged with the National Center for Healthy Housing), through the first environmental grant of the Vira I. Heinz Endowment. In 1992, she was a Delegate to the Earth Summit, representing Non-Governmental Organizations.

In 1993, with Kerry and environmentalist academic Dr. Anthony Cortese, she co-founded Second Nature, which brings "Education for Sustainability" to college campuses. In 1993, she founded the Heinz Awards, including a category for Outstanding Contributions to the Environment. In 1995, with a $20 million grant, the Heinz Endowments provided initial funding for The Heinz Center, "a nonprofit institution dedicated to improving the scientific and economic foundation for environmental policy through multisectoral collaboration among industry, government, academia, and environmental organizations."

Since 1996, Heinz has hosted an annual "Women's Health and the Environment" conference series. She founded Teresa Heinz Scholars for Environmental Research, which annually awards eight $10,000 awards for doctoral dissertation support and eight $5,000 awards for Masters' thesis support for research having "public policy relevance that increases society's understanding of environmental concerns and proposed solutions." Heinz is a board member of the Environmental Defense Fund.

Women's economic security programs and advocacy
In 1995, the book Pensions in Crisis: Why the system is failing America and how you can protect your future (later republished as The Pension Book) was published, with support from the Teresa and H. John Heinz III Foundation, and a foreword by Heinz.

Spurred by the issues uncovered by Pensions in Crisis, Heinz and her foundation created the Women's Retirement Initiative to "extend that investigation and examine how the dynamics of our pension and retirement system contribute to the disproportionate rate of poverty among older women."

In 1996, the Heinz Foundations created WISER, the Women's Institute for a Secure Retirement.

Wealth
Heinz is estimated to be worth between $750 million and $1.2 billion. In 2017 Heinz and Kerry listed an ocean-front home on Nantucket for sale at $25 million.

Politics
Like her first husband, Heinz was a registered Republican for most of her voting life, and she remained a registered Republican despite being married to Kerry. In January 2003, she changed her registration to the Democratic Party.

In 2003, Heinz was named to the PoliticsPA list of "Pennsylvania's Most Politically Powerful Women".

Heinz is said to have been encouraged to run for her first husband's vacant Senate seat after his death. Heinz declined and refused to endorse Republican Congressman Rick Santorum's 1994 bid for the seat. She publicly denounced him as the "antithesis" of her late husband, and later called him "Forrest Gump with attitude." It was rumored she would challenge Santorum in 2006 (as a Democrat), but she did not enter the race, and the Democratic nomination went to State Treasurer Bob Casey Jr., who went on to defeat Santorum.

Heinz has a reputation in the media as a very direct personality. In an interview published in USA Today in July 2004, Heinz was asked about the differences between then-First Lady Laura Bush and herself:
"Well, you know, I don't know Laura Bush. But she seems to be calm, and she has a sparkle in her eye, which is good. But I don't know that she's ever had a real job—I mean, since she's been grown up. So her experience and her validation comes from important things, but different things. And I’m older, and my validation of what I do and what I believe and my experience is a little bit bigger–because I’m older, and I’ve had different experiences. And it’s not a criticism of her. It’s just, you know, what life is about."
Heinz retracted the statement later, saying she was "sincerely sorry" for the remark. "I had forgotten that Mrs. Bush had worked as a schoolteacher and librarian, and there couldn't be a more important job than teaching our children", Heinz said. "As someone who has been both a full time mom and full time in the workforce, I know we all have valuable experiences that shape who we are. I appreciate and honor Mrs. Bush's service to the country as first lady, and am sincerely sorry I had not remembered her important work in the past."

Bush brushed it off, saying, "It didn't matter to me. It didn't hurt my feelings. It was perfectly all right that she apologized. She didn't have to apologize. I know how tough it is. And actually I know those trick questions."

References

External links

 The Heinz Awards
 JohnKerry.com – About Teresa
 Polite society anticipates Teresa's pizazz – from the Washington Times
 The Heinz Endowments (the Howard Heinz Endowment and the Vira I. Heinz Endowment)
 Visitsunvalley.com – This Moment On Earth 
 

1938 births
Living people
American philanthropists
Colonial people in Mozambique
Forbes family
Heinz family
John Kerry
Kerry family
People from Maputo
Businesspeople from Pittsburgh
Portuguese businesspeople
Portuguese expatriates in Mozambique
Portuguese emigrants to the United States
Portuguese philanthropists
Spouses of Massachusetts politicians
Spouses of Pennsylvania politicians
United Nations interpreters
University of the Witwatersrand alumni
University of Geneva alumni
Carnegie Mellon University trustees
Pennsylvania Republicans
Pennsylvania Democrats
Portuguese women in business
People from Fox Chapel, Pennsylvania
Naturalized citizens of the United States
American officials of the United Nations
People from Georgetown (Washington, D.C.)
People from Beacon Hill, Boston
Portuguese people of British descent